Ismail Khel also rendered as Ismael Khel, Ismaeel Khel and Ishmael Khel is a Pashtun tribe in Pakistan and Afghanistan. Ismail Khel is settled and resides in Bannu; a historic district in the Khyber Pakhtunkhwa province, city of Attock area Chhachh, and Khost Province of Afghanistan.

See also
Pashtun Tribes
Pashtun diaspora
Pakhtunkhwa
Pakthas

References

External links 
 Pakhtun Tribes

Pashtun tribes
Ethnic groups in Khost Province

ru:Хан, Гулам Исхак